St. Aloysius Senior Secondary School is a co-ed catholic school located in the city of Jabalpur, Madhya Pradesh, India. It is affiliated to Central Board of Secondary Education. Established in the year 1868, it is one of the oldest schools in India.

History 
In 1858, Fr. Thevenet (Nagpur Diocese), obtained a piece of land from the military authorities, and built a temporary chapel, which was blessed on 22 June 1858. Fr. Amedee Delalex started the school exclusively for boys in that church in 1868. The school followed the University of Cambridge International Examinations. The primary section of the school was recognised in the year 1873, and the classes were held in the new church building, which was constructed in the same year. The middle section of the school got recognised in 1884 by the British government. The present building was erected by Fr. Thevenet to house the school for Europeans and was later extended for Indians also. The school started boarding European students in 1887, while the Indian boarding section was started in 1903, which later became the St. Thomas School, and now functions as a separate school.

India gained independence from the British in 1947, and the European boarding section was shut down in 1949, which later became a part of the present St. Aloysius College. Post independence, the school got affiliated to the Board of Secondary Education, Madhya Pradesh. Computer education was started in the year 1987 from class III onwards. The school affiliated with the Central Board of Secondary Education, New Delhi in 1992, and became coeducational in the year 1998, admitting girls along with boys. Smart classes were introduced in 2008.

Administration 
The Roman Catholic Diocese of Jabalpur runs schools, colleges, hospitals, cathedrals and boardings. Jabalpur Diocesan Educational Society (JDES) manages the educational institutions. It also conducts non-formal education and medical camps, both in urban and rural areas. It came into existence on 3 May 1968. The Catholic Bishop of the Diocese of Jabalpur is the President of the society.

The society has more than 30 schools and boardings in the urban and rural areas of Jabalpur, Shahdol, Sagar, Anuppur, Umaria, Seoni, Katni, Mandla and Dindori districts. Apart from the schools and boardings, it conducts non-formal education classes and also conducts social service activities like medical camps, social awareness programmes, etc. in the rural areas. The society also administers several cathedrals, the St. Aloysius Schools at Polipathar and Rimjha, the St. Thomas School, St. Aloysius Institute of Technology, St. Aloysius College, all situated in Jabalpur, and the Katra Hospital in Mandla.

Admission
The school has an open-admission policy. It is done solely on the basis of merit. Normally admission in Pre-K.G. takes place in the months of December & January. At the time of admission to Pre-K.G., the child should have completed 4 years. The age of admission to the other classes should be reckoned accordingly.

Education system
The school has a coeducational system, following the norms and syllabi laid down by the Central Board of Secondary Education. The medium of conduct is strictly English. It has classes from Kindergarten up to the Senior Secondary level. Each class has four sections: A, B, C & D, having a strength of about 45 pupils in each of the sections. The school offers courses in Science and Commerce at the Senior Secondary level.

The academic session begins in the month of April and continues till March, with May and June as summer vacation. The winter vacation is of 10–15 days and comes around Christmas. The school timings for Kindergarten and Class I are 07:50 am to 01:00 pm. For Classes II to X, the timings are 07:50 am to 02:00 pm.

Notable alumni
 Admiral Jal Cursetji - 10th Chief of the Naval Staff of India.
 Lt. General K. T. Parnaik - Governor of Arunachal Pradesh.
 Lt. General WAG Pinto - 8th General Officer Commanding-in-Chief of the Central Command.
 Maj. General G. D. Bakshi - Retired Major General of Indian Army, leading defence analyst of India.
 Dr. Jitendra Malik - Indian-American academic, who is the Arthur J. Chick Professor of Electrical Engineering and Computer Sciences at University of California, Berkeley.
 Ron Norris - Represented India in boxing at the 1952 Summer Olympics.
 Tarun Bhanot - Former Finance Minister of Madhya Pradesh.
 Neelesh Awasthi - Member of the Madhya Pradesh Legislative Assembly.
 Ankit Raaj - Model, film and television actor.

Gallery

References

External links 
St. Aloysius Senior Secondary School (Official website)

Educational institutions established in 1868
1868 establishments in India
Catholic secondary schools in India
Primary schools in India
Schools in Madhya Pradesh
High schools and secondary schools in Madhya Pradesh
Private schools in Madhya Pradesh
Christian schools in Madhya Pradesh
Education in Jabalpur